Brachodes straminella is a moth of the family Brachodidae. It is found in Mongolia and Russia.

References

Moths described in 1916
Brachodidae